Kongudi   is a village in the  
Aranthangi revenue block of Pudukkottai district, Tamil Nadu, India.

Geographics
Geographically Kongudi falls about 8 km SW of Aranthangi town and 6 km NE of K.Pudupatti. Communications are far enough to reach the towns. Surrounding villages are connected by a tarroad  A major road near the village is Karaikudi-Thanjavur (SH-26). On the SH-26 there is a village called Otthakadai. From there to Kongudi is about 3 km by tar road. The town bus runs three times daily to and from Aranthangi bus number25 . From Aranthangi we can move different parts of the state. The nearest major railways are Pudukottai and Karaikudi. The nearest airport is Tiruchirapalli (international).

Geology
Geologically this village is covered by soil of Quaternary to very recent age, No rock exposure,  soil covers like black clay and yellowish brown clayey silt. A major river is Vellaru, a Non pernial river flowing from north of Pudukottai to the Bay of Bengal (sea). It meets the ocean near Meemisal. The Vellaru river is the main source for the most of the water pond along the flowing path. Mainly the villagers are doing agriculture of Paddy crop that too seasonally. So all are depend on rain, apart from that sand exporting business touched the peak level from vellaru which is flowing North of village. But the worst thing is that when the people become a rich they used to move to the townships.

Population & Community
In total around 500 peoples are currently living in both genders in the village. As per the 2001 census, Kongudi had a total population of 426 with 205 males and 221 females. Out of the total population 259 people were literate.

All belong to the Hindu religion and with some subcaste mainly dominated by Vallam Velallars called Vallambar(belong to 84 nadu). Most of the villagers are illiterate about 60-70%. Mainly the village rolling by Vallambars because they are the one dominated and higher caste than rest. So the ancient Katta-panchayathu still existing in this village with vallambars head(Ambalam). Most of the youngsters are below 35 years of age, residing in foreign countries like Singapore, Malaysiya, Kuwait, and some are in major cities of the state.

This village is mainly traditional based and temples like Rakkammal koil, Ravuttha mandar koil, Subramaniyar koil, Ayyanar koil, Mariyamman Koil, Pillayar koil are famous. Besides the national festival the local village festival like Madhu eduppu, Kuthirai eduppu, Kidai vettu, Paniyaram padaippu and kavadi eduppu in both Kongudi athani village. Rakkammal temple is very powerful for especially women's whoever born that subdivision name is mennan  vagaiyara that is why rakkammmal is first God and they are need to give potti  this festival is here very famous

Notable places
The famous and powerful temple called Rakkammal koil is very famous for Snake bit because here the ayurvedic medicine is given.

Village issues
The village faces issues with drinking water & employment.

References

Villages in Pudukkottai district